Marc Broussard is the fifth studio album by Marc Broussard.

It is a collection of all-new material and was preceded by a digital EP release ("Marc Broussard EP"). It was released on June 14, 2011 with a deluxe edition available on iTunes and Amazon MP3. It includes the two lead singles "Lucky" and "Only Everything."

Track listing
"Lucky" (Marc Broussard, Jamie Kenney)
"Only Everything" (Broussard, Kenney, B. Glover)
"Cruel" (Broussard, Kenney, Jeff Cohen, Robert Marvin)
"Yes Man" (Broussard, Kenney)
"Let It All Out" (Broussard, Kenney)
"Emily" (Broussard, Kenney, Glover)
"Our Big Mistake" (Broussard, Kenney)
"Bleeding Heart" (Broussard, Kenney)
"Eye On The Prize" (Broussard, Kenney, C. Clement, Chad Gilmore, DeMarco Johnson, Calvin Turner)
"Let Me Do It Over / Gibby's Song" (Hidden Bonus Track) (Broussard, Kenney)

Deluxe edition bonus tracks
"Could You Believe"
"Stay With Me"
"Let Me Do It Over" (Demo)

Personnel

 Roy Agee - trombone
 Nia Allen - choir, background vocals
 David Angell - violin
 Monisa Angell - viola
 Marc Broussard - lead vocals, background vocals
 Tom Bukovac - acoustic slide guitar, acoustic guitar, electric guitar, bass guitar
 Tyler Burkum - electric guitar
 Gary Burnette - electric guitar
 John Catchings - cello
 Latera Conley - choir
 Mark Crozier - background vocals
 David Davidson - string arrangements, violin
 Eleonore Denig - violin
 Mark Douthit - saxophone
 Jason Eskridge - choir
 Chad Gilmore - drums
 Chris Graffagnino - acoustic guitar, electric guitar
 Peter Groenwald - background vocals
 Tony Hall - bass guitar
 Jamie Kenney - brass arrangements, Fender Rhodes, glockenspiel, Hammond B-3 organ, keyboards, mellotron, percussion, piano, upright piano, programming, string arrangements, synthesizer, vibraphone, background vocals, Wurlitzer
 Tony Lucido - bass guitar
 Jeremy Lutito - drums
 Robert Marvin - programming
 Dan Needham - drums
 Calvin Nowell - choir
 Steve Patrick - trumpet
 Nirva Ready - choir, background vocals
 Adam Shoenfeld - acoustic guitar, electric guitar
 Pam Sixfin - violin
 Javier Solís - congas, percussion
 Akil Thompson - bass guitar, electric guitar
 Calvin Turner - bass guitar, string arrangements
 Kris Wilkinson - viola

Singles
"Lucky" and "Only Everything" were released as the two lead singles from the album. The former was performed on Lopez Tonight on June 13, 2011, while both songs have garnered some radio airplay on the Triple A chart.

"Cruel" was released as the album's third single. The music video premiered on August 10, 2011.

Reception
The album debuted at #102 on the Billboard 200 chart, and #37 on the Rock Albums chart.

References

2011 albums
Marc Broussard albums
Atlantic Records albums